The William Travis Award Ribbon is an award within the awards and decorations of the Texas State Guard Nonprofit Association that may be presented to a member of the Texas Military Forces, within the United States Armed Forces.

Eligibility
The William Travis Award Ribbon may be awarded to any person for achievements closely related to the security of the State.

Use
"The William Travis Award Ribbon is awarded by the Texas State Guard Nonprofit Association for distinguished achievement furthering the aims and goals of the Texas Military Forces or the Texas State Guard component of the Texas State Guard Nonprofit Association. The nominee has demonstrated loyalty by demonstrating a commitment to the organization, to the leadership of the organization, and the organization's mission. This service was conducted with the highest military standard of leadership and integrity for the betterment of others". The actions of the nominee must include 3 years of service to the security of the State of Texas. The nominee is not required to be a current member or associate member of the Texas State Guard Nonprofit Association or a current or former member of the Military Forces of the State of Texas but the achievement should be closely related to the security of the State. Second and additional receipt of this award is indicated by a bronze star. There is not a separate medal awarded with the ribbon.

References

Awards and decorations of the Texas Military Forces
Ribbon symbolism